Elias (fl. 6th century) was a Greek scholar and a commentator on Aristotle and Porphyry.

He was a pupil of Olympiodorus in Alexandria in the late-6th century. His name suggests that he was a Christian. A commentary on Porphyry's Isagoge written in Greek has survived. Some fragments survive of a commentary he wrote on the Prior Analytics of Aristotle, and he is known to have written on the De Interpretatione of Aristotle. It is also possible that the extant Commentary on Aristotle's Categories which is attributed to David was actually written by Elias.

In addition, a second extant commentary on Porphyry's Isagoge was falsely ascribed to Elias. The commentary was also falsely ascribed to David, and it has been conjectured that it may have been written by Stephen of Alexandria.

Historians from the Stanford Encyclopedia of Philosophy pointed out
Moreover, Elias repeatedly emphasizes the Platonic-Neoplatonic conviction that the purpose of philosophy is the transformation or assimilation of a human being to the godhead, a genuinely Platonic ideal explicitly stated in the Theaetetus, (176A-B).

See also
Protrepticus (Aristotle)

References

Further reading
Elias and David: Introductions to Philosophy with Olympiodorus: Introduction to Logic. [Translated by Sebastian Gertz]. Bloomsbury: London. 2017.

External links

6th-century Byzantine people
6th-century philosophers
Byzantine philosophers
Commentators on Aristotle
6th-century Byzantine writers